mdadm is a Linux utility used to manage and monitor software RAID devices. It is used in modern Linux distributions in place of older software RAID utilities such as raidtools2 or raidtools.

mdadm is free software originally maintained by, and copyrighted to, Neil Brown of SUSE, and licensed under the terms of version 2 or later of the GNU General Public License.

Name
The name is derived from the md (multiple device) device nodes it administers or manages, and it replaced a previous utility mdctl. The original name was "Mirror Disk", but was changed as more functions were added. The name is now understood to be short for Multiple Disk and Device Management.

Overview 
Linux software RAID configurations can include anything presented to the Linux kernel as a block device.  This includes whole hard drives (for example), and their partitions (for example).

RAID configurations 

 RAID 0 – Block-level striping.  MD can handle devices of different lengths, the extra space on the larger device is then not striped.
 RAID 1 – Mirror.
 RAID 4 – Like RAID 0, but with an extra device for the parity.
 RAID 5 – Like RAID 4, but with the parity distributed across all devices.
 RAID 6 – Like RAID 5, but with two parity segments per stripe.
 RAID 10 – Take a number of RAID 1 mirrorsets and stripe across them RAID 0 style.

RAID 10 is distinct from RAID 0+1, which consists of a top-level RAID 1 mirror composed of high-performance RAID 0 stripes directly across the physical hard disks.  A single-drive failure in a RAID 10 configuration results in one of the lower-level mirrors entering degraded mode, but the top-level stripe performing normally (except for the performance hit).  A single-drive failure in a RAID 0+1 configuration results in one of the lower-level stripes completely failing, and the top-level mirror entering degraded mode.  Which of the two setups is preferable depends on the details of the application in question, such as whether or not spare disks are available, and how they should be spun up.

Non-RAID configurations 
 Linear – concatenates a number of devices into a single large MD device.
 Multipath – provides multiple paths with failover to a single device.
 Faulty – a single device which emulates a number of disk-fault scenarios for testing and development.
 Container – a group of devices managed as a single device, in which one can build RAID systems.

Features 
Under 2.4.x kernels and earlier these two were the only options. Both of them are non-partitionable.

Since 2.6.x kernels, a new type of MD device was introduced, a partitionable array. The partitions were identified by adding , where  is the partition number; thus  for example. Since version 2.6.28 of the Linux kernel mainline, non-partitionable arrays can be partitioned, the partitions being referred to in the same way as for partitionable arrays for example, .

Since version 3.7 of the Linux kernel mainline, md supports TRIM operations for the underlying solid-state drives (SSDs), for linear, RAID 0, RAID 1, RAID 5 and RAID 10 layouts.

Booting 
Since support for MD is found in the kernel, there is an issue with using it before the kernel is running.  Specifically it will not be present if the boot loader is either (e)LiLo or GRUB legacy.  Although normally present, it may not be present for GRUB 2.  In order to circumvent this problem a  filesystem must be used either without md support, or else with RAID1.  In the latter case the system will boot by treating the RAID1 device as a normal filesystem, and once the system is running it can be remounted as md and the second disk added to it.  This will result in a catch-up, but  filesystems are usually small.

With more recent bootloaders it is possible to load the MD support as a kernel module through the initramfs mechanism. This approach allows the  filesystem to be inside any RAID system without the need of a complex manual configuration.

External metadata 
Besides its own formats for RAID volumes metadata, Linux software RAID also supports external metadata formats, since version 2.6.27 of the Linux kernel and version 3.0 of the  userspace utility.  This allows Linux to use various firmware- or driver-based RAID volumes, also known as "fake RAID".

, there are two supported formats of the external metadata:

 DDF (Disk Data Format), an industry standard defined by the Storage Networking Industry Association for increased interoperability.
 Volume metadata format used by the Intel Rapid Storage Technology(RST), former Intel Matrix RAID, implemented on many consumer-level motherboards.

mdmpd 
mdmpd was a daemon used for monitoring MD multipath devices up to Linux kernel 2.6.10-rc1, developed by Red Hat as part of the mdadm package. The program was used to monitor multipath (RAID) devices, and is usually started at boot time as a service, and afterwards running as a daemon.

Enterprise  storage requirements often include the desire to have more than one way to talk to a single disk drive so that in the event of some failure to talk to a disk  drive via one controller, the system can automatically switch to another controller and keep going.  This is called multipath disk access. The linux  kernel implements  multipath disk access via the software RAID stack known as the md (Multiple Devices) driver.  The kernel portion of the md multipath driver only  handles routing I/O requests to the proper device and handling failures on the active path.  It does not try to find out if a path that has previously failed might be working again.  That's what this daemon does.  Upon startup, it reads the current state of the md  raid  arrays, saves  that  state,  and then waits for the kernel to tell it something interesting has happened.  It then wakes up, checks to see if any paths on a  multipath  device have  failed, and if they have then it starts to poll the failed path once every 15 seconds until it starts working again.  Once it starts working  again, the  daemon will  then add the path back into the multipath md device it was originally part of as a new spare path.

If one is using the  filesystem,  lists all active md devices with information about them. Mdmpd requires this to find arrays to monitor paths on, to get notification of interesting events and to monitor array reconstruction on Monitor mode.

Technical details Raid 1 
The data on a raid 1 Volume will be the same like the data in a normal Partition. The RAID Information will stored in the last 128kB of the Partition. This means, to convert a RAID 1 Volume to normal data Partition it is possible to decrease the Partition size about 128kB and change the Partition ID from fd to 83 (for linux).

See also 

 Software RAID
 bioctl on OpenBSD/NetBSD

References

External links 

 mdadm source code releases
 
 

Free software programmed in C
Free system software
Linux file system-related software
RAID